Reyna Pacheco (born 1 July 1994 in Mexico) is an American professional squash player. As of February 2018, she was ranked number 77 in the world.

Early life
Pacheco grew up in San Diego after immigrating from Tijuana, Mexico with her mother and brother at the age of 4. She was an illegal immigrant until the age of 18 when she received her Permanent Resident Card shortly before attending Columbia University, on a Bill and Melinda Gates Millennium scholarship.

In popular culture
Pacheco's story was featured in the true stories collection "Little America" from Epic Magazine. and served as the storyline for the second episode of the TV Series Little America.

References

1994 births
Living people
American female squash players
American sportspeople of Mexican descent
Undocumented immigrants to the United States
21st-century American women